Patrick Franklin Kelly (born October 14, 1967) is a former Major League Baseball infielder who played in the major leagues for nine seasons, seven of them with the New York Yankees.

Life and career
Kelly was born in Philadelphia, Pennsylvania, and attended Catasauqua High School.

He was drafted by the New York Yankees in the ninth round of the 1988 amateur draft, but did not make his playing debut at the major league level until May 20, 1991, at age 23. In 1995, with the Yankees battling for the AL Wild Card, Kelly hit a crucial two-run home run in the ninth inning against the Blue Jays in Toronto to cap a Yankee rally from a 3–0 deficit in the third to last game of the season.  Due to Kelly's go-ahead home run, the Yankees won the game 4–3 and were able to qualify for the playoffs two days later.  

Kelly played seven seasons with the Yankees (1991–1997), spent 1998 with St. Louis Cardinals, and spent the first part of the 1999 season with the Toronto Blue Jays.  He played his final MLB game on June 5, 1999, retiring on March 22, 2000.

Kelly batted and threw right-handed.  His career Major League totals were .249 batting average, 36 home runs, and 495 hits in 681 games. Kelly moved to Australia in 2001 and scouted for American baseball teams there. In 2009, he became an assistant coach with the Australia national baseball team. At the same time, he became the general manager for the Adelaide Bite in the Australian Baseball League team. 

In 1994, Kelly married Rebecca Pontifex of Adelaide, Australia, who worked in public relations.

References

External links

1967 births
Living people
Albany-Colonie Yankees players
American expatriate baseball players in Canada
Baseball coaches from Pennsylvania
Baseball players from Philadelphia
Catasauqua High School alumni
Columbus Clippers players
Gulf Coast Yankees players
Major League Baseball left fielders
Major League Baseball second basemen
Major League Baseball shortstops
Major League Baseball third basemen
New York Yankees players
Norwich Navigators players
Oneonta Yankees players
Prince William Cannons players
Sportspeople from Northampton County, Pennsylvania
St. Louis Cardinals players
Tampa Yankees players
Toronto Blue Jays players
Somerset Patriots players
Syracuse SkyChiefs players
West Chester Golden Rams baseball players
American expatriate baseball players in Australia